Plegadis is a bird genus in the family Threskiornithidae. The genus name derives from Ancient Greek plegados, "sickle", referring to the distinctive shape of the bill. Member species are found on every continent except Antarctica as well as a number of islands. The glossy ibis is easily the most widespread of the three species. Plegadis contains the following three species:

A further two fossil species have been placed in the genus:
 Plegadis paganus from the Early Miocene deposits in France; however, it is now placed in Gerandibis pagana.
 Plegadis pharangites

References

 
Ibises
Bird genera
Taxa named by Johann Jakob Kaup
Taxonomy articles created by Polbot